The "Tarantella Napoletana" is the tarantella associated with Naples. It is familiar to North American viewers of popular media as a quintessentially Italian musical riff or melody.

Examples of its use include Gioachino Rossini's "La Danza" from Soirées Musicales (1830–1835).

The tarantella was adapted into the 1950 song "Lucky, Lucky, Lucky Me" written by Buddy Arnold and Milton Berle, and performed by Evelyn Knight and the Ray Charles Band.

See also
Arabian riff, "The Streets of Cairo", "The Poor Little Country Maid", "the snake charmer song"
Jarabe Tapatío, the "Mexican hat dance"
Oriental riff, stereotypical pentatonic riff

References

Ethnic and racial stereotypes
Musical analysis
Musical terminology
Riffs
Neapolitan songs